Peak Wildlife Park is a zoo in central England. The nearest towns are Leek, Ashbourne and Stoke-on-Trent.

The zoo was originally known as Blackbrook Zoological Park, but entered administration in 2014 and closed. It was purchased by Jake Veasey and Colin MacDougall and reopened under its current name in 2015.

History 

Blackbrook Zoological Park was established in 1991 by Diana Holloway and her son, Mark Rubery. Holloway was already experienced in running a wildlife visitor attraction, having owned and run Hillside Bird Oasis in Mobberley, Cheshire since 1974. Blackbrook quickly developed into a large bird collection in its own right. Following Diana Holloway's death in 2006, running of the zoo passed to her son Mark. Development and expansion continued in subsequent years: in 2006, a new entrance, gift shop and café were constructed, and in 2008, a £500,000 penguin exhibit was added. Hillside Bird Oasis was forced to close to the public in 2002 following complaints from local residents over increasing traffic levels, but it was still maintained by the owners as a private breeding facility. In 2008 the zoo became a charity and begun to focus on conservation and education. The zoo received no government grants.

Blackbrook held over 200 species of bird and around 40 mammals and reptiles. It had large collection of cranes, pelicans, and waterfowl. Some of the animals that were exhibited are listed below:

Birds 

 Humboldt penguin
 Grey peacock-pheasant
 Great argus
 Siamese fireback
 Boat-billed heron
 Magellanic steamer duck
 African spoonbill
 Hammerkop
 Red-crowned crane
 White naped crane
 Sarus crane
 Wattled crane
 Demoiselle crane
 Black-necked crane
 Sandhill crane

Mammals 

 Meerkat
 Black and white ruffed lemur
 Visayan warty pig
 Wallaby
 Maneless Zebra
 Brown Lemur
 Flemish Giant Rabbit
 Patagonian mara
 Ring-tailed lemur
Cameroon Sheep
African Pygmy Goat
Valais Blacknose Sheep
Dik-Dik
Otter

Notes

External links 

Zoos in England
Tourist attractions in Staffordshire
Tourist attractions of the Peak District
Buildings and structures in Staffordshire
Zoos established in 1991
1991 establishments in England